Vladyslav Bondar (born 24 March 2000) is a professional Ukrainian football midfielder who plays for Enerhiya Nova Kakhovka in the Ukrainian Second League.

Career
Bondar is a product mainly of the Bastion Chornomorsk and Mariupol youth sportive school systems.

He made his début for FC Mariupol in the Ukrainian Premier League as a substituted player in a drawing match against defending champion FC Shakhtar Donetsk on 1 December 2019.

References

External links
Profile at the Official UAF Site (Ukr)
 

2000 births
Living people
People from Chornomorsk
Ukrainian footballers
FC Mariupol players
FC Kramatorsk players
FC Podillya Khmelnytskyi players
FC Enerhiya Nova Kakhovka players
Ukrainian Premier League players
Association football midfielders
Sportspeople from Odesa Oblast